Shokrabad-e Kavir (also Romanized as Shokrābād-e Kavīr; also known as Shokrābād and Salārābād) is a village in Behnamarab-e Jonubi Rural District, Javadabad District, Varamin County, Tehran Province, Iran. At the 2006 census, its population was 10, in 6 families.

References 

Populated places in Varamin County